Zé Ramalho ao vivo is the first (and currently only) live album by Brazilian solo artist Zé Ramalho, apart from his live recorded performances with other artists. It was released in 2005.

Track listing

Personnel 
 Zé Ramalho – Lead vocals, acoustic guitar, arrangements
 Chico Guedes – Bass guitar
 Sandro Moreno – Drums, Cajón
 Zé Gomes – Percussion
 Marcos Amma – Percussion
 Dodô de Moraes – Keyboards
 Toti Cavalcanti – Wind instruments
 Rick Ferreira – Electric guitar, acoustic guitar, steel guitar, arrangement on "Corações Animais"
 Robertinho de Recife – Electric guitar and bass guitar on "Corações Animais"
 Luiz Antônio – Arrangement and keyboards on "Corações Animais"
 Gabriel Martau – Drums on "Corações Animais"

References

Zé Ramalho albums
2005 live albums
Sony Music Brazil live albums